TriDelta may refer to:

 TriDelta Transit, a California transit agency
 Delta Delta Delta, a United States collegiate sorority